Viola praemorsa is a species of violet known by the common names canary violet, Astoria violet, and yellow montane violet.

Description
This rhizomatous perennial herb grows up to 30 centimeters in maximum height. The thick, fleshy leaf blades are lance-shaped to oval with pointed or rounded tips, the basal ones up to 8.5 centimeters long and those higher on the stem the same or slightly longer. The leaf blades are often coated densely in hairs and are borne on long petioles. A solitary flower is borne on a long, upright stem. It has five yellow petals, the lowest three veined with brownish purple, and the upper two often with brownish purple coloring on the outer surfaces.

Distribution and habitat
Viola praemorsa is native to western North America from British Columbia and Alberta in Canada; to Washington, Oregon, Idaho, Montana, Wyoming, Utah, California, Nevada, and Colorado in the U.S. It occurs on mountain slopes, usually where forests or grassy meadows are present, in moist or dry soil. In California, it often occurs in yellow-pine forests.

References

External links
Washington Burke Museum
Photo gallery

praemorsa
Plants described in 1829
Flora of Alberta
Flora of British Columbia
Flora of California
Flora of Colorado
Flora of Idaho
Flora of Montana
Flora of Oregon
Flora of Nevada
Flora of Utah
Flora of Washington (state)
Flora of Wyoming
Flora without expected TNC conservation status